Aaron Steele (born 1 February 1987) is an English retired footballer who played as a defender. He began his career at Brentford, for whom he made one professional appearance, before joining Slough Town in 2005 and retiring in 2006.

Playing career

Brentford 
Steele began his career as a youth at Brentford. His maiden call into the first team squad came for the final League One match of the 2004–05 regular season against already-promoted Hull City and he was an unused substitute during the 2–1 victory. Steele failed to appear in Brentford's unsuccessful 2005 playoff campaign, but the decision to release him was reversed and he was retained as a third-year scholar for the 2005–06 season.

Steele received his first call into the first team squad of the 2005–06 season for a League Cup first round match against League Two club Cheltenham Town on 23 August 2005 and made his professional debut when he came on as a substitute for Ryan Peters in the 86th minute of the humiliating 5–0 defeat. He was called into the first team again for a Football League Trophy first round match with Oxford United on 18 October, but remained on the bench during the shootout defeat. Steele was informed in January 2006 that he would not be offered a professional contract and he departed Griffin Park.

Slough Town (loan and permanent signing) 
Steele joined Isthmian League Premier Division club Slough Town on loan in December 2005 and the move became permanent in January 2006. He made 23 appearances during the second half of the 2005–06 season and retired from football.

Personal life 
After his retirement from football in 2006, Steele began working as a petroleum operator for the army.

Career statistics

References

External links

1987 births
Living people
English footballers
Association football midfielders
Brentford F.C. players
Slough Town F.C. players
Footballers from Twickenham
Isthmian League players